Tenderloin District may refer to:

Tenderloin, Manhattan
Tenderloin, San Francisco

See also
 Tenderloin (disambiguation)